Crotalaria exaltata is a species of plant in the family Fabaceae. It is found only in Ethiopia.

References

exaltata
Flora of Ethiopia
Near threatened plants
Taxonomy articles created by Polbot